The 1969 Inter-Cities Fairs Cup Final was the final of the eleventh Inter-Cities Fairs Cup. It was played on 29 May and 11 June 1969 between Newcastle United of England and Újpesti Dózsa of Hungary. Newcastle won the tie 6–2 on aggregate.

Route to the final

Match details

First leg

Second leg 

Newcastle United win 6–2 on aggregate

See also 
 1968–69 Inter-Cities Fairs Cup
 Newcastle United F.C. in European football
 Újpest FC in European football

Notes

References 
 RSSSF

2
International club association football competitions hosted by Hungary
International club association football competitions hosted by England
Inter-Cities Fairs Cup Final 1969
Inter-Cities Fairs Cup Final 1969
1969
Inter
Inter
Inter-Cities Fairs Cup Final
Inter-Cities Fairs Cup Final
International sports competitions in Budapest
1960s in Budapest
20th century in Tyne and Wear